Doris Kunstmann (born 22 October 1944) is a German actress. She has appeared in more than one hundred films since 1963.

Selected filmography

References

External links 
 

1944 births
Living people
German film actresses
German television actresses
20th-century German actresses
21st-century German actresses
Actresses from Hamburg